Lewin's rail (Lewinia pectoralis) is a species of bird in the family Rallidae. It is also known as the water rail, Lewin's water rail, Lewin's grind rail, slate-breasted rail, slate-breasted water rail, pectoral rail, pectoral water rail, short-toed rail and short-toed water rail.

Its common name and Latin binomial commemorate English naturalist and illustrator William Lewin.

It is found in Australia, Wallacea, and New Guinea. Its natural habitat is subtropical or tropical moist lowland forests.

Subspecies
Eight subspecies have been described:

L. p. exsul (Hartert, 1898) – Flores, Wallacea
New Guinea
L. p. mayri (Hartert, 1930) – Arfak Mountains
L. p. captus (Mayr & Gilliard, 1951) - central New Guinea
L. p. insulsus (Greenway, 1935) - Herzog Mountains
L. p. alberti (Rothschild & Hartert, 1907) - mountains of south-eastern New Guinea
Australia
L. p. clelandi (Mathews, 1911) – south-western Australia (extinct)
L. p. pectoralis (Temminck, 1831) – eastern and south-eastern Australia
L. p. brachipus (Swainson, 1838) – Tasmania

Conservation status
Lewin's rails are not listed as threatened on the Australian Environment Protection and Biodiversity Conservation Act 1999.  However, their conservation status varies from state to state within Australia. For example:

Lewin's rail is listed as threatened on the Victorian Flora and Fauna Guarantee Act (1988).  Under this Act, an Action Statement for the recovery and future management of this species has not yet been prepared.<ref>[http://www.dse.vic.gov.au/DSE/nrenpa.nsf/LinkView/617768308BCB666E4A25684E00192281E7A24BB36FF60A144A256DEA00244294 Department of Sustainability and Environment, Victoria] </ref>  It is also notable that the Lewin's rail is listed by an earlier scientific name (Dryolimnas pectoralis) under this Act.

On the 2007 advisory list of threatened vertebrate fauna in Victoria, the Lewin's rail is listed as vulnerable.

A subspecies of Lewin's rail, listed as Lewin's water rail (Rallus pectoralis clelandi''), is on Western Australia's Wildlife Conservation (Specially Protected Fauna) Notice 2008 Schedule 2 — Fauna presumed to be extinct, under the WA Wildlife Conservation Act 1950.

Along Kedron Brook in Brisbane, the bird is described as rare and threatened.  The Brisbane Airport's construction of a second runway initially included 38 hectares of wetlands to be set aside for habitat. This was later expanded to 49 hectares to provide a more appropriate vegetation corridor.

Lewin's rail is protected under the Nature Conservation Act 1992. It is an offence to damage or interfere with Lewin's rail in any other way than when accepted by the Act.

Redland City Council manages environmental pests throughout the Redlands to minimize their impact on native ecosystems and birds such as Lewin's rail.

Habits
Lewin's rail is a highly secretive bird. This species prefers permanent, fresh-to-saline wetlands surrounded by dense vegetation. That means it can be found in artificial wetlands surrounded by dense vegetation. Lewin's rails breed over the summer period, laying three to five eggs in their saucer-shaped ground nests, which they build from dry vegetation such as reeds and grasses. The nests usually sit just above the water's edge in dense reeds and grassland. These birds forage in shallow water around the water's edge, under the cover of surrounding vegetation and aquatic plants. Lewin's rails feed mainly on invertebrates and occasionally bird eggs and frogs.

Threatening
Loss of habitat due to changes in water body structure, disruption of nests, and predation by introduced species.

Media

See also

List of birds of Australia
List of birds of Indonesia
List of birds of Papua New Guinea

References

External links

Lewin's rail
Birds of New Guinea
Birds of New South Wales
Birds of Queensland
Birds of Tasmania
Birds of Victoria (Australia)
Lewin's rail
Articles containing video clips
Taxonomy articles created by Polbot